Geldrop is a railway station located in Geldrop, a town in the Dutch municipality of Geldrop-Mierlo, in the province of North Brabant. The station was opened on 1 November 1913 and is located on the Eindhoven–Weert railway. The station is operated by Nederlandse Spoorwegen.

Train service
The following services currently call at Geldrop:
2x per hour local services (sprinter) Eindhoven - Weert

External links
NS website 
Dutch Public Transport journey planner 
 Geldrop railway station (gp) between Eindhoven (ehv) and Weert (wt), departure schedules: ,  

Railway stations in North Brabant
Railway stations opened in 1913
Geldrop-Mierlo
1913 establishments in the Netherlands
Railway stations in the Netherlands opened in the 20th century